Mary Virginia Duval (1850-1930) was an American textbook author. She was born in Rome, Georgia to James Calvin Duval and Almeda Melita.

She was raised in Mississippi and educated in private schools. When she began teaching, she learned that most students learned U.S. history, but not the history of Mississippi and sought to remedy that. Her publications, including The Students' History of Mississippi (1886) and History of Mississippi and Civil Government (1892) were subsequently added to the state's curriculum in 1890.

References

19th-century American writers
1850 births
1930 deaths